The canton of Cazères is an administrative division of the Haute-Garonne department, southern France. Its borders were modified at the French canton reorganisation which came into effect in March 2015. Its seat is in Cazères.  Its coverage was expanded in July 2017 as part of the Haure reorganisation. 

It consists of the following communes:
 
Agassac
Alan
Ambax
Anan
Aulon
Aurignac
Bachas
Beaufort
Benque
Bérat
Boissède
Boussan
Boussens
Bouzin
Cambernard
Cassagnabère-Tournas
Castelgaillard
Castelnau-Picampeau
Casties-Labrande
Cazac
Cazeneuve-Montaut
Cazères
Coueilles
Couladère
Eoux
Esparron
Fabas
Forgues
Le Fousseret
Francon
Frontignan-Savès
Fustignac
Goudex
Gratens
L'Isle-en-Dodon
Labastide-Clermont
Labastide-Paumès
Lahage
Latoue
Lautignac
Lescuns
Lherm
Lilhac
Lussan-Adeilhac
Marignac-Lasclares
Marignac-Laspeyres
Martisserre
Martres-Tolosane
Mauran
Mauvezin
Mirambeau
Molas
Mondavezan
Monès
Montastruc-Savès
Montberaud
Montbernard
Montclar-de-Comminges
Montégut-Bourjac
Montesquieu-Guittaut
Montgras
Montoulieu-Saint-Bernard
Montoussin
Palaminy
Peyrissas
Peyrouzet
Le Pin-Murelet
Plagne
Plagnole
Le Plan
Polastron
Poucharramet
Pouy-de-Touges
Puymaurin
Rieumes
Riolas
Saint-André
Saint-Araille
Sainte-Foy-de-Peyrolières
Saint-Élix-le-Château
Saint-Élix-Séglan
Saint-Frajou
Saint-Laurent
Saint-Michel
Sajas
Salerm
Samouillan
Sana
Savères
Sénarens
Terrebasse

References

Cantons of Haute-Garonne
States and territories established in 1801